The White Priory Murders is a mystery novel by the American writer John Dickson Carr (1906–1977), who published it under the name of Carter Dickson.  It is a locked room mystery and features his series detective, Sir Henry Merrivale, assisted by Scotland Yard Inspector Humphrey Masters.

Plot summary
Marcia Tait is a Hollywood star who has come to England to make a historical film.  She is found beaten to death in the Queen's Mirror pavilion, the 17th-century trysting place of King Charles II and his mistresses.  The problem is particularly puzzling because the pavilion is surrounded by newfallen snow, with only one set of footprints leading to it and none leading away.  The suspects include a man who thought he was marrying her — and her husband, whose marriage was unknown to all.

Sir Henry Merrivale lends a hand to Inspector Masters in the investigation, but is too late to stop the second murder before Merrivale solves the case.

Literary significance and criticism
"Sir Henry Merrivale is caught up in the murder of a wilful actress; it's done inside a pavilion, snow is on the ground, and there are crowds of candidates for her favors and for the role of murderer. ... The telling is done in Carter Dickson's usual long and diffuse talk which he thinks conversation; oddities are added for pseudo suspense; people shout, whirl, say What! in italics, and generally the thing is irritation unrelieved even by a second murder."

Publication history
 1934, USA, William Morrow, Pub date December 1934, Hardback, 305pp (first US edition)
 1935, UK, Heinemann, Pub date 1935, Hardback, 282pp (first UK edition)
 1942, USA, Pocket Books 156, Pub date 1942, Paperback, (first US pb edition)
 1946, USA, serialized in Crime Digest, June
 1951, UK, Penguin Books 811, Pub date 1951, Paperback, 251pp (first UK pb edition)
 1982, USA, Bantam 20572-2, Pub date 1982, Paperback, 214pp
 1991, USA, International Polygonic , Pub date 1991, Paperback, 191pp (Library of Crime Classics)

References

1934 American novels
Novels by John Dickson Carr
Locked-room mysteries
William Morrow and Company books